The Sehol E10X is an electric city car produced by Sehol of JAC Motors based on the same platform as the JAC iEV6E from 2016 which also shared the same platform as the JAC Yueyue and Refine S2 Mini.

Overview 

Teased during a battery technology display in November 2020, the Sehol E10X was officially launched in 2021 with presales starting in March 2021 and debut in April at the 2021 Shanghai Auto Show. It is equipped with MacPherson struts in the front and a twist-beam suspension in the rear.

Powertrain
In terms of power, the E10X is powered by a selection of two electric motors rated at 41 PS (40 hp / 30 kW) and 61 PS (60 hp / 45 kW). The max torque of the motors respectively amounts to 95 Nm (70 lb-ft) and 150 Nm (110 lb-ft). Both variants top out at 102 km/h (63 miles per hour) and drive the front axle.

Battery
The E10X is equipped with cobalt-free LFP batteries. The battery of the base model is a 15-kWh traction battery good for 150 km (93 miles) of NEDC-rated range, with more expensive 19.7-kWh variant with 200km of range and 30.2-kWh variant with 302km of range available as well. The charging port is concealed in the front left fender.

Trim levels
There are seven trim levels of the E10X to choose from. The entry model includes air conditioning, a single airbag, ABS, Isofix, power windows, and power mirrors. Higher trim models add a second airbag, ESP, imitation leather, keyless entry and launch, cruise control, an infotainment system with voice command support and OTA updates, a wireless charger, USB slots, and more. The cabin of the E10X can accommodate either four or five occupants.

Safety
It scored zero stars in the Latin NCAP crash test in December 2022.

References

External links 

Sehol E10X
Production electric cars
City cars
Hatchbacks
Cars introduced in 2021
2010s cars